"One Thing Leads 2 Another" is a song by Australian recording artist Vanessa Amorosi, released in October 2002 as the lead single from Amorosi's second studio album Change.

In November 2002, Amorosi sang her song "One Thing Leads 2 Another" at a charity concert in Frankfurt am Main. Other celebrity participants were Sarah Connor, Nena, Oli P., Peter Maffay, DJ Bobo, Isabel, Katy Karrenbauer, Rosenstolz, Ben, ATC, Pierre, B3, Band Ohne Namen, Bell Book and Candle, Laith Al-Deen, Marlon, The Flames, She Loe, Rednex, Lutricia McNeal and the Kelly Family. The "Charity 2002" yielded net proceeds of approximately 500.000,00 euro for children with cancer. All proceeds went to the "Hand in Hand for Children" association.

Music video 
The video clip for "One Thing Leads 2 Another" was shot in September 2002 at the Tempodrom arena in Berlin.

Track listing 
CD single

Charts

Cover versions
 Paulini Curuenavuli cover of Amorosi's 'One Thing Leads To Another' is featured on the Australian Idol: The Final 12 album, released in 2003. The song being written by Mark Holden, a judge on the show.

Release history

References 

2002 singles
Vanessa Amorosi songs
Songs written by Mark Holden
Songs written by Axel Breitung
Songs written by Vanessa Amorosi
2002 songs
Universal Music Group singles